Events from the year 2004 in Finland

Incumbents
 President: Tarja Halonen
 Prime Minister: Matti Vanhanen
 Speaker: Paavo Lipponen

Events

Deaths
6 January: Markku Salminen, orienteer (b. 1946)
16 January: Kalevi Sorsa, politician, prime minister 1972–1975, 1977–1979, 1982–1987 (b. 1930)
26 February: Adolf Ehrnrooth, general (b. 1905)
30 July: Vivica Bandler, theatre director (b. 1917)
12 November: Usko Meriläinen, composer (b. 1930)
24 December: Lauri Silvennoinen, Olympic cross-country skier (1948 silver medal winner in men's 4 x 10 kilometre cross-country skiing relay) (b. 1916)

References

 
Years of the 21st century in Finland
Finland
2000s in Finland
Finland